Rikan Lateef Kadhim Alkhineefir (born October 5, 1990) is an Iraqi kickboxer . he is the 2017 Asian Indoor and Martial Arts Games. The world champion 2019 and the champion of Iraq since 2013 until now, in a weight of 75 kg.

Titles and accomplishments 

 2019 World Kickboxing Championships in Russia ( 75 kg) Gold medalist
 2017 Kickboxing at the 2017 Asian Indoor and Martial Arts Games( 75 kg) Gold medalist
 2017 Asian Indoor and Martial Arts Games ( 75 kg) Gold medalist
 2016 Arabian Kickboxing Championship (75 kg) Bronze medalist
 2014 Arabian Kickboxing Championship (75 kg) Bronze medalist
 2013 World Kickboxing Championships in Russia ( 75 kg) Bronze medalist

References 

1990 births
Living people
Iraqi male kickboxers
Basra Governorate